Donald Munro (February 18, 1855 – April 14, 1939) was a Canadian politician who was a member of the Legislative Assembly of New Brunswick and Mayor of Woodstock, New Brunswick.

Munro was the son of David Munro, a member of the Legislative Assembly from 1863 to 1865.

In 1883, Munro was a founding member of the Woodstock Royal Arch Chapter.

For many years, Munro was superintendent of Woodstock's water works and superintendent and purchasing agent for the Woodstock Electric Light Plant.

In 1906, Munro was elected Mayor of Woodstock. He defeated H. D. Stevens 451 to 198. He was reelected in 1907. In 1908, Munro was elected to the Legislative Assembly of New Brunswick. He resigned in 1916 to become Registrar of Wills and Deeds for Carleton County. Munro died in 1939.

References

Mayors of Woodstock, New Brunswick
Members of the Legislative Assembly of New Brunswick
1855 births
1939 deaths
Canadian Presbyterians